Andrea Diewald (born 28 December 1981) is a German former competitive figure skater. She is a four-time German national medalist and competed twice at the World Junior Championships.

Programs

Competitive highlights

References

External links 
 
 Andrea Diewald at Tracings.net

1981 births
Living people
German female single skaters
People from Rosenheim
Sportspeople from Upper Bavaria